Helsingørmotorvejen is a highway in Sjælland, Denmark. It goes between Hans Knudsens Plads, Copenhagen to Helsingør.

On 27 September 2014, during a road work where parts of the highway would be extended from 4 to 6 total lanes, a bridge under construction collapsed on the highway.

References

Highways in Denmark